Thyromolis is a monotypic moth genus in the family Erebidae erected by George Hampson in 1901. Its only species, Thyromolis pythia, was first described by Herbert Druce in 1900. It is found in French Guiana, Guyana, Bolivia and the Brazilian state of Amazonas.

References

Phaegopterina
Monotypic moth genera
Moths described in 1900
Moths of South America